The Portia School is a historic school building at City Park in Portia, Arkansas. The two story red brick structure was built in 1914, and was the small town's only school until 1948. It is by far the most architecturally significant early-20th century building in the community. The building is five bays wide, with each pair of bays flanking the central one stepped back, giving it a rough cross shape. The entrance is housed in the central bay, with a gabled pediment at the roof line. The main roof is hipped, with brackets in the eaves and a cupola at the center.

The building was listed on the National Register of Historic Places.

See also
National Register of Historic Places listings in Lawrence County, Arkansas

References

School buildings on the National Register of Historic Places in Arkansas
School buildings completed in 1914
Buildings and structures in Lawrence County, Arkansas
National Register of Historic Places in Lawrence County, Arkansas
1914 establishments in Arkansas